Kostas Chatzimichail is a Greek former footballer who played as a forward and a former manager.

Club career
Chatzimichail started playing football at the academies of AEK Athens. He was promoted to the men's team in 1956, where he played for 3 seasons before he was given as an exchange, as a part of the transfer of Manolis Kanellopoulos from Egaleo in 1959, after the suggestion Tryfon Tzanetis. After a brief spell in Egaleo, he was transferred to the Prasina Poulia where he played as a player-coach until 1967 and managed to win the promotion to the second division in 1961.

Managerial career
Chatzimichail returned to the AEK Αthens after he retired as a footballer, where he replaced Georgios Daispangos in the technical leadership of the team's infrastructure departments. For four years he was also the coach of the second team of the club, continuing the work of Daispangos and after the changes in 1969 by the then manager of the first team, Branko Stanković, he also took over as assistant of the Yugoslav coach. In the difficult last season of Stanković, after the defeat by Apollon Kalamarias in the Cup, he was anointed the first coach of AEK as an interim. He sat on the bench of AEK once, on 11 February 1973 in the 2–0 away defeat against Panserraikos. He remained with the team as an assistant to the next manager, Billy Bingham, while still leading the club's infrastructure departments until 1975, where he departed from the club.

He continued his career at Doxa Drama, which he took over in the summer of 1975 and left in November 1976. He returned to Doxa in 1978, where he promoted the club in the first division after 14 years of absence. He left at the beginning of the following season and worked in Veria for one season, the Greek military team, in Kalamata and Niki Volos, before returning to Doxa Drama in with whom he made an admirable run until 1983. His move to Kavala in 1983 was also admirable, where he managed to keep the team in the division, despite the 10-point penalty in the start of the season. In fact, under his instructions, he achieved the best defense in the division and collected just two points less from the two teams that won the promotion to the first division. His last spell was at Pierikos in 1985.

Honours

As a player

Egaleo
Athens FCA Championship: 1959–60

Prasina Poulia
Messinia FCA Championship: 1960–61

As a manager

Doxa Drama
Beta Ethniki: 1978–79

References

Living people
Greek footballers
Super League Greece players
AEK Athens F.C. players
Egaleo F.C. players
AEK F.C. non-playing staff
AEK Athens F.C. managers
Doxa Drama F.C. managers
Veria F.C. managers
Kalamata F.C. managers
Niki Volos F.C. managers
Kavala F.C. managers
Pierikos F.C. managers
Association football forwards
Greek football managers
Year of birth missing (living people)